A Woman Under the Influence is a 1974 American drama film written and directed by John Cassavetes. The story follows a woman (Gena Rowlands) whose unusual behavior leads to conflict with her blue-collar husband (Peter Falk) and family. It received two Academy Award nominations, for Best Actress and Best Director.

In 1990, the film was selected for preservation in the United States National Film Registry as being "culturally, historically, or aesthetically significant", one of the first fifty films to be so honored.

Plot 
Mabel Longhetti, a Los Angeles housewife and mother, sends her three children to spend the night with her mother but is extremely hesitant to do so. She is a heavy drinker and exhibits strange behavior. That night, she meets a man at a bar and he takes her home. Despite her protests, he forces her to dance with him and appears to sexually assault her at the bottom of the stairs. She wakes up the next morning in bed and the man is still there. She is confused and briefly argues with him before he leaves calling him by her husband’s name. Her construction foreman husband, Nick, argues with his crew over bringing them to his house, saying he is ashamed of his 'crazy' wife. He succumbs to their cajoling and brings them over without being able to call Mabel beforehand. She makes everyone spaghetti, which Nick seems strangely critical of. The meal is superficially pleasant, then sours once Nick snaps at Mabel for flirting and dancing with the men.

Mabel's strange mannerisms and increasingly odd behavior continue to be a source of concern for Nick. She hosts a birthday party, but one of the child's parents becomes disturbed by her behavior and is reluctant to leave his children alone with her, asking if she's been drinking. When Nick comes home, he gets into a fistfight with the child's father, who then leaves with his children. Nick also angrily slaps Mabel in front of the children. He brings a doctor to evaluate her mental health. Mabel grows increasingly angry and suspicious and Nick fights off the doctor when he attempts to sedate her. Convinced she has become a threat to herself and others, the doctor institutionalizes her.

Nick returns to work and is annoyed by the workers' interest in Mabel's situation. He gets into an altercation with a worker named Eddie, who falls down a hill and is severely injured. He picks up the children from school in the middle of the day to go to the beach and allows them to sip his beer, proving himself to be an equally unsuitable parental figure.

Six months later, Nick plans a large surprise welcome home party for Mabel's return from the institution. However, his mother points out that this may be overwhelming for her. Nick overreacts by sending off all of the non-family guests with screams and shouts. When Mabel arrives, she is apprehensive and quiet, in great contrast to her former outgoing and eccentric personality. Nick tries to make her feel comfortable, but to no avail. The evening degenerates in yet another emotional and psychologically taxing event for Mabel. She reveals she underwent electroshock therapy in the mental hospital and becomes increasingly distraught.

After the guests leave, Mabel has a breakdown and cuts herself. When she stands on a sofa and refuses to come down, Nick slaps her and causes her to fall. She appears to recover somewhat and puts the kids to bed while they express their love for her. Nick and Mabel prepare their bed together as the credits roll.

Cast 
 Gena Rowlands as Mabel Longhetti 
 Peter Falk as Nick Longhetti
 Fred Draper as George Mortensen
 Lady Rowlands as Martha Mortensen
 Katherine Cassavetes as Margaret Longhetti
 Matthew Laborteaux as Angelo Longhetti
 Matthew Cassel as Tony Longhetti
 Christina Grisanti as Maria Longhetti

Production 
John Cassavetes was inspired to write A Woman Under the Influence when his wife Gena Rowlands expressed a desire to appear in a play about the difficulties faced by contemporary women. His completed script was so intense and emotional she knew she would be unable to perform it eight times a week, so he decided to adapt it for the screen. When he tried to raise funding for the project, he was told "No one wants to see a crazy, middle-aged dame."

Lacking studio financing, Cassavetes mortgaged his house and borrowed from family and friends, one of whom was Peter Falk, who liked the screenplay so much he invested $500,000 in the project. The crew consisted of professionals and students from the American Film Institute, where Cassavetes was serving as the first "filmmaker in residence" at their Center for Advanced Film Studies. Working with a limited budget forced him to shoot scenes in a real house near Hollywood Boulevard, and Rowlands was responsible for her own hairstyling and makeup.

Upon completion of the film, Cassavetes was unable to find a distributor, so he personally called theater owners and asked them to run the film. According to college student Jeff Lipsky, who was hired to help distribute the film, "It was the first time in the history of motion pictures that an independent film was distributed without the use of a nationwide system of sub-distributors." It was booked into art houses and shown on college campuses, where Cassavetes and Falk discussed it with the audience. It was shown at the San Sebastián Film Festival, where Rowlands was named Best Actress and Cassavetes won the Silver Shell Award for Best Director, and the New York Film Festival, where it captured the attention of film critics like Rex Reed. When Richard Dreyfuss appeared on The Mike Douglas Show with Peter Falk, he described the film as "the most incredible, disturbing, scary, brilliant, dark, sad, depressing movie" and added "I went crazy. I went home and vomited," which prompted curious audiences to seek out the film capable of making Dreyfuss (who is himself bipolar) ill.

Critical reception 
On review aggregator website Rotten Tomatoes, the film has an approval rating of 91% based on 32 reviews, with a rating average of 8.1/10. The website’s critical consensus reads: "Electrified by searing performances from Gena Rowlands and Peter Falk, A Woman Under the Influence finds pioneering independent filmmaker John Cassavetes working at his artistic peak."

Nora Sayre of The New York Times observed "Miss Rowlands unleashes an extraordinary characterization....The actress’s style of performing sometimes shows a kinship with that of the early Kim Stanley or the recent Joanne Woodward, but the notes of desperation are emphatically her own....Peter Falk gives a rousing performance...and the children are very well directed. But the movie didn't need to be 2 hours and 35 minutes long: there's too much small talk, which doesn't really reveal character. Still, the most frightening scenes are extremely compelling, and this is a thoughtful film that does prompt serious discussion."

Roger Ebert of the Chicago Sun-Times rated the film four out of four stars and called it "terribly complicated, involved and fascinating – a revelation." He added "The characters are larger than life (although not less convincing because of that), and their loves and rages, their fights and moments of tenderness, exist at exhausting levels of emotion. [...] Cassavetes is strongest as a writer and filmmaker at creating specific characters and then sticking with them through long, painful, uncompromising scenes until we know them well enough to read them, to predict what they'll do next and even to begin to understand why." Ebert later added the film to his "Great Movies" list, in which he called the film "perhaps the greatest of Cassavetes' films."

Time Out London wrote "The brilliance of the film lies in its sympathetic and humorous exposure of social structure. Rowlands unfortunately overdoes the manic psychosis at times, and lapses into a melodramatic style which is unconvincing and unsympathetic; but Falk is persuasively insane as the husband; and the result is an astonishing, compulsive film, directed with a crackling energy."

TV Guide rated the film four out of four stars, calling it "tough-minded" and "moving" and "an insightful essay on sexual politics."

In Sight and Sound's 2012 poll on the greatest films of all time, the film placed 59th in the directors' poll and 144th in the critics' poll. In 2015, the BBC named A Woman Under the Influence the 31st greatest American film ever made.

Pauline Kael of The New Yorker, however, condemned the film as a "didactic illustration of (R.D.) Laing's version of insanity.” Stanley Kauffmann of The New Republic also panned the film in his 1974 review of it. He wrote: "To me this film is utterly without interest or merit". John Simon called A Woman Under the Influence "Dreadful."

Awards and honors

Restoration and preservation 
The world premiere screening of a restored print was held at the Castro Theatre in San Francisco on April 26, 2009, as part of the San Francisco International Film Festival. Gena Rowlands was in attendance and spoke briefly. The restoration was done by the UCLA Film & Television Archive with funding provided by Gucci and the Film Foundation.

Home media 
In 1992 Touchstone Home Video released the movie on VHS.

On September 21, 2004, the film was released in Region 1 – together with Shadows, Faces, The Killing of a Chinese Bookie, and Opening Night – as part of the eight-disc box set John Cassavetes – Five Films by The Criterion Collection. The film is in anamorphic widescreen format with an English audiotrack. Bonus features include commentary by sound recordist and composer Bo Harwood and camera operator Mike Ferris and interviews with Gena Rowlands and Peter Falk. On October 22, 2013, the box set was re-released on Blu-ray.

See also
 List of American films of 1974
 Mental illness in film
 Bipolar disorder

References

Further reading
Carney, Raymond Francis, Junior, “American Dreaming: The Films of John Cassavetes and the American Experience,” (Berkeley and Los Angeles, California and London: University of California Press, 1985).

External links 
A Woman Under the Influence essay  by Ray Carney at National Film Registry
A Woman Under the Influence essay by Daniel Eagan in America's Film Legacy: The Authoritative Guide to the Landmark Movies in the National Film Registry, A&C Black, 2010 , pages 709-710. 

A Woman Under the Influence: The War at Home an essay by Kent Jones at the Criterion Collection
A Woman Under the Influence, interview from May 2, 1975, by Nicholas Pasquariello
"All Naked All the Time" – a close reading of the film with comparisons to Gertrude Stein's "Melanctha"

1974 films
1974 drama films
American drama films
1970s English-language films
American independent films
Films about psychiatry
Films directed by John Cassavetes
Films featuring a Best Drama Actress Golden Globe-winning performance
Films set in Los Angeles
United States National Film Registry films
1974 independent films
Films about dysfunctional families
1970s American films